Iolaus stewarti is a butterfly in the family Lycaenidae. It is found in north-eastern Zambia. The habitat consists of montane areas.

The larvae feed on Phragmanthera usuiensis usuiensis and Erianthemum schelei.

References

Butterflies described in 1985
Iolaus (butterfly)
Endemic fauna of Zambia
Butterflies of Africa